Portugal Cove South is a small fishing town on the southern shore of the Avalon Peninsula of Newfoundland in the province of Newfoundland and Labrador, Canada. Portugal Cove South had a population of 225 in the Canada 2006 Census, down to 86 in Canada 2021 Census.

Demographics 

See also
 List of cities and towns in Newfoundland and Labrador

References

External links
Portugal Cove South Visitor Centre
Portugal Cove South - Encyclopedia of Newfoundland and Labrador, vol. 4, p. 409-410.

Populated coastal places in Canada
Portuguese-Canadian culture
Towns in Newfoundland and Labrador